WCL may stand for:

 Washington College of Law, American University's law school in Washington, D.C.
 Wellington City Libraries, the Wellington public libraries (New Zealand)
 West Coast League, summer baseball league in the Pacific Northwest
 Western Coalfields Limited, India
 Wide curb lane, also known as a wide outside lane, the outermost lane of a roadway
 World Chess Live, an internet chess server
 World Combat League, a defunct kickboxing promotion
 World Confederation of Labour, an international confederation of trade unions
 World Cricket League, a series of international cricket tournaments for teams without Test status
 World Cup Live, the World Cup show on ESPN and ESPN2
 Workers Communist League (Gitlowites), an American political party